Viscount Devonport, of Wittington in the County of Buckingham, is a title in the Peerage of the United Kingdom. It was created on 22 June 1917 for the Liberal politician and former Member of Parliament for Devonport, Hudson Kearley, 1st Baron Devonport. He had already been created a Baronet, of Wittington in the Parish of Medmenham in the County of Buckingham on 22 July 1908, and Baron Devonport, of Wittington in the County of Buckingham, on 15 July 1910.  the titles are held by his grandson, the third Viscount, who succeeded his father in 1973.

The family seat is Ray Demesne, near Kirkwhelpington, Northumberland.

Viscounts Devonport (1917)
Hudson Ewbanke Kearley, 1st Viscount Devonport (1856–1934)
Gerald Chester Kearley, 2nd Viscount Devonport (1890–1973)
Terence Kearley, 3rd Viscount Devonport (b. 1944)

The heir presumptive is the present holder's first cousin, Chester Dagley Hugh Kearley (b. 1932)
The heir presumptive's heir apparent is his son David Hudson Kearley (b. 1982)

Notes

References

Kidd, Charles, Williamson, David (editors). Debrett's Peerage and Baronetage (1990 edition). New York: St Martin's Press, 1990, 

Viscountcies in the Peerage of the United Kingdom
Noble titles created in 1917
Noble titles created for UK MPs